Grenville Dean Wilson (January 26, 1833 - September 20, 1897), was an American pianist and composer, who composed over 150 pieces, mostly for piano solo.

Biography 
G.D. Wilson was born in Lenox, Massachusetts. He worked in Nyack, New York, as a piano teacher from about 1870 until his death. He was the founder and conductor of the Nyack Choral Society and the Nyack Philharmonic Orchestra. He also founded the Nyack Library.

Compositions 
Opus 1 - Gai Printemps, Idylle for Piano
Opus 4 - Shepherd Boy for Piano (Shattinger; same as Opus 14)
Opus 5 - Night Breezes, Nocturne for Piano
Opus 6 - Au Revoir, Caprice for Piano
Opus 10 - Happy Days, Pensée Fugitive for Piano
Opus 11 - The Merry Bells, Caprice for Piano
Opus 12 - La Coquette, Galop for Piano
Opus 13 - A Night in June, Idylle for Piano
Opus 14 - The Shepherd Boy, Summer Idyl for Piano (Ditson; same as Opus 4)
Opus 15 - The Fairest One, Valse for Piano
Opus 16 - Morning, Rêverie for Piano
Opus 18 - Two Idylles for Piano
Among the Hills
Memory
Opus 22 - Sleep Well!, Nocturne for Piano
Opus 23 - Dreaming of Home - Transcription sur une Romance de C.R. Howard, for Piano
Opus 25 - Happy Return, Romance sans Paroles for Piano
Opus 26 - Trippin' thru' the Meadows, Rondo Polka for Piano
Opus 32 - Eola, Mazurka for Piano
Opus 35 - The little Wanderer, Idylle for Piano
Opus 36 - Laughing Wave, Mazurka Brillante for Piano
Opus 37 - Dance of the Haymakers, Morceau de Concert for Piano
Opus 38 - Fairy Bells, Morceau de Salon for Piano
Opus 39 - Whispering Breezes, Morceau de Salon for Piano
Opus 40 - Sonatine for Piano
Opus 42 - The Chapel, Rêverie for Piano (also known as The Wayside Chapel)
Opus 43 - In Our Boat, Morceau for Piano
Opus 46 - Christmas Bells, Morceau de Salon for Piano
Opus 48 - Sounds from the Palisades, for Piano
Opus 50 - Blushing Roses, for Piano
Opus 55 - The Stranger's Story, Tone-poem for Piano
Opus 56 - Westward Ho!, Grande Galop de Concert for Piano
Opus 60 - Moonlight on the Hudson, Morceau for Piano
Opus 65 - Au Bord du Lac, Morceau de Genre for Piano
Opus 72 - The Red Cross, Grande Marche for Piano
Opus 75 - Pride of our Home, Nocturne for Piano
Opus 81 - Merry Christmas, Morceau de Salon for Piano
Opus 84 - Reveries of the Past, Romance sans Paroles for Piano
Opus 130 - Esmeralda, Scherzo-waltz for Piano
Opus 144 - Sonatina in G major for Piano
Opus 162 - Laughing Eyes, for Piano
Opus 163 - Pleasant Dreams, for Piano
Opus 164 - The Chapel in the Mountains, Tone Picture for Piano

Without opus number
A cross Country! - Gallop for Piano
Evening Reverie for Piano
The Hesper Polka - for Piano
Sweet Murmurs - Caprice for Piano
Material for Early Piano Instruction - Three Books

External links

1833 births
1897 deaths
American male classical composers
American classical composers
19th-century classical composers
19th-century American pianists
19th-century American composers
American male pianists
19th-century American male musicians